The Church of Christ the King belongs to Catholic Apostolic Church trustees; it is in Gordon Square, Bloomsbury, London. It adjoins Dr Williams's Library and is within sight of University College London. The church is used by the Anglican mission Euston Church for Sunday services and its English Chapel, at its east end, by Forward in Faith for weekday services. It has been a Grade I listed building since 10 June 1954, one of 129 such Christian buildings in London.

Construction and design

In 1853, a fine organ was erected by Gray and Davison. It was a three manuals organ with pedals, containing 13 stops on the Great-organ, 12 stops on the Swell-organ, 10 stops on the Choir-organ and 8 on the pedal. In total there were 6 couplers. A specification of the organ as it now is can be found on the National Pipe Organ Register. One of the first organists was Edmund Hart Turpin. In 1903 a sub bass 16 ft was added to the choir-organ.

Annette Peach, in her entry for Brandon in the Dictionary of National Biography, writes:

"The Catholic Apostolic Church in Gordon Square, London, was built between 1850 and 1854 and, though reproducing features recorded by the Brandon brothers in their scholarly works, this extremely large church was criticized by a contemporary for its lack of originality of design. Recent scholars, however, have drawn attention to the combination of 13th- and 15th-century Gothic precedents in its design, which offer a tangible record of the Brandon brothers' study of ecclesiastical architecture."

The church was designated a Grade I listed building on 10 June 1954.

University Church
From 1963 to 1994, it was known as the University Church of Christ the King and served the Anglican Chaplaincy to the Universities and Colleges of the Diocese of London.  In practice, it was a worship centre for students living in the university halls nearby, but was also used occasionally for London-wide events, with a very strong emphasis on music in worship (under the successive musical directorships of Ian Hall, Alan Wilson and Simon Over).

This new role was begun with a morning Eucharist at which the Bishop of London, the Right Reverend Robert Stopford, celebrated and an Evensong with the former Bishop of London, J. W. C. Wand, preaching), both on 6 October 1963.  During this period, a Thanksgiving Eucharist was celebrated on 27 November 1988 for the 25th anniversary of this role, with the Right Reverend Michael Marshall preaching and, on 6 December 1983, the memorial service for Nikolaus Pevsner was held here.

Euston Church 
Euston Church, a Church of England Bishop's Mission Order plant, started meeting in the church from September 2015, with services  at 11am, 3pm and 5pm.

Forward in Faith
The Lady Chapel / English Chapel at the east end of the Church is used by the Anglican Forward in Faith movement. Mass is celebrated on each weekday at 12.30pm.

References

Further reading 

Site remembering the Anglican university chaplaincy formerly based at the church
Mystery Worshipper report from Ship of Fools
Letter of John Betjeman on the church

External links

Camden.gov.uk – Listing details

Churches completed in 1853
19th-century Church of England church buildings
Bloomsbury
Grade I listed churches in London
Irvingism
History of the University of London
Gothic Revival church buildings in London
Buildings and structures in Bloomsbury